Kostas Vasiliou (1914 – 1 May 2003), was a Cypriot footballer who played as a striker and later a manager.

Career

Vasiliou started his football career at EPA Larnaca in 1934. In 1935 he continued at APOEL with which he won the championship of the 1935–36 season. In 1936 he was transferred to AEK Athens. He was the first Cypriot to play for AEK. With AEK he won the Panhellenic Championship and the Greek Cup in 1938–39, as well as the Panhellenic Championship 1939–40. During his stay in Greece, Vasiliou participated in three friendly matches of Greece.

He returned to Cyprus in 1945 and joined APOEL until 1947. He won the championship and the Cypriot Cup in 1946–47. In the period 1947–48 he took over as a player-coach of AEL Limassol with which he won the Cup 1947–48. In the period 1949–50 he took over as a player-coach at Anorthosis Famagusta, leading them to the winning the league for the first time in their history.  He again managed Anorthosis from 1951 to 1953. He then took over as coach of Nea Salamina in the 1954–55 season, leading the team to win the Cypriot Second Division and to be promoted to the first division for the first time in their history.

Personal life
Vasiliou was the first husband of Rena Vlahopoulou, whom he met in 1938 and married a year later. He was a photographer by profession. His great-grandson, Nikos Englezou was also a football player of AEK Athens for a short time. Vasiliou died on 1 May 2003.

Honours

As a player

APOEL
Cypriot First Division: 1935–36, 1946–47
Cypriot Cup: 1946–47

AEK Athens
Panhellenic Championship: 1938–39, 1939–40
Greek Cup: 1938–39

Individual
Panhellenic Championship top scorer: 1938–39

Player-coach

AEL Limassol
Cypriot Cup: 1947–48

Anorthosis Famagusta
Cypriot First Division: 1949–50

Coach

Nea Salamina
Cypriot Second Division: 1954–55

References

1914 births
Cypriot footballers
EPA Larnaca FC players
APOEL FC players
AEK Athens F.C. players
AEL Limassol players
Anorthosis Famagusta F.C. players
AEL Limassol managers
Anorthosis Famagusta F.C. managers
Nea Salamis Famagusta FC managers
2003 deaths
Association football forwards
Greece international footballers
People from Limassol